Eurylister is a genus of clown beetles in the family Histeridae. There are more than 40 described species in Eurylister.

Species
These 41 species belong to the genus Eurylister:

 Eurylister bakewelli (Marseul, 1864)
 Eurylister brevimargo (Schmidt, 1895)
 Eurylister brevis (Schmidt, 1889)
 Eurylister carolinus (Paykull, 1811)
 Eurylister ceramicola (Marseul, 1864)
 Eurylister convexiusculus (MacLeay, 1871)
 Eurylister crassus (Bickhardt, 1913)
 Eurylister desbordesi (Cooman, 1930)
 Eurylister discrepans (Marseul, 1879)
 Eurylister disparilis (Lewis, 1900)
 Eurylister dispersus Bickhardt, 1920
 Eurylister distinctus (Schmidt, 1892)
 Eurylister dorsalis (Lewis, 1905)
 Eurylister duplicans (Cooman, 1955)
 Eurylister egregius Bickhardt, 1920
 Eurylister elinguus (Lewis, 1885)
 Eurylister glabrifrons (Mazur, 1994)
 Eurylister guinensis (Mazur, 1989)
 Eurylister infans Bickhardt, 1920
 Eurylister integrus (Schmidt, 1889)
 Eurylister laevidorsum (Lewis, 1905)
 Eurylister laevis (Marseul, 1853)
 Eurylister mimicus (Lewis, 1914)
 Eurylister molestus Cooman, 1955
 Eurylister mutilatus (Schmidt, 1893)
 Eurylister niger (Bousquet & Laplante, 2006)
 Eurylister nudus Bickhardt, 1920
 Eurylister oberndorferi (Schmidt, 1889)
 Eurylister pictipennis (Lewis, 1901)
 Eurylister pygidialis (Lewis, 1905)
 Eurylister reinecki Bickhardt, 1920
 Eurylister satzumae (Lewis, 1889)
 Eurylister scalptus (Lewis, 1902)
 Eurylister silvestria (Schmidt, 1897)
 Eurylister silvestris (Schmidt, 1897)
 Eurylister sincerus (Schmidt, 1892)
 Eurylister solitarius (Lewis, 1891)
 Eurylister terminatus (Schmidt, 1895)
 Eurylister tonkinensis (Cooman, 1956)
 Eurylister uniformis (Lewis, 1894)
 Eurylister vitalisi (Desbordes, 1919)

References

Further reading

 
 
 
 

Histeridae
Articles created by Qbugbot